Mert is the surname of:

 Bahar Mert (born 1975), Turkish volleyball player
 Burak Mert (born 1990), Turkish volleyball player
 Mesut Mert (born 1978), Canadian association football player and coach
 Metehan Mert (born 1999), Turkish footballer
 Muhammed Mert (born 1995), Belgian footballer
 Nuray Mert (born  1960), Turkish journalist and political scientist
 Oksana Andrusina-Mert (born 1973), Turkish female discus thrower also known as Oksana Mert